Andryjanki  is a village in the administrative district of Gmina Boćki, within Bielsk County, Podlaskie Voivodeship, in north-eastern Poland.

According to the 1921 census, the village was inhabited by 287 people, among whom 82 were Roman Catholic, 201 Orthodox, and 4 Mosaic. At the same time, 152 inhabitants declared Polish nationality, 135 Belarusian. There were 51 residential buildings in the village.

References

Andryjanki